Spotted Bear Creek is a stream in the U.S. state of South Dakota.

Spotted Bear Creek has the name of a local member of the Sioux tribe.

See also
List of rivers of South Dakota

References

Rivers of Haakon County, South Dakota
Rivers of Ziebach County, South Dakota
Rivers of South Dakota